The International Business Brokers Association (IBBA) is a non-profit association operating for people and firms engaged in business brokerage and mergers and acquisitions in the USA and Canada. This association provides business brokers education, conferences, professional designations, and networking opportunities. The IBBA was formed in 1983, and most members are based in the US and in Canada through there are a few from elsewhere in the world. The IBBA strives to create a professional relationship with successful business transaction advisors (i.e. CPAs, bankers, attorneys, and other related associations), to increase the image and value of the IBBA to its members and to be a leader in the exchange of business referrals. 

The minimum annual fee for an individual to be a member of the IBBA is $475. IBBA offers a directory of business brokers on their site. It portrays itself as an international directory but it is focused almost exclusively on business brokers in North America. IBBA has an arrangement with a business listing site, BizBuySell, which allows the IBBA to publish all BizBuySell's listings under the IBBA banner.

Function
The IBBA provides educational courses for business brokers. It awards the Certified Business Intermediary (CBI) certification, and runs courses and seminars required to obtain this certification. Certified Business Intermediary (CBI) is the designation awarded to IBBA members who satisfy educational requirements and adhere to IBBA's standards.

Affiliates and Chapters
Affiliates

Regional (US)
Arizona Business Brokers Association
Business Brokers of Florida
California Association of Business Brokers
Colorado Association of Business Intermediaries
Carolina - Virginia Business Brokers Association
Georgia Association of Business Brokers
Mid-Atlantic Business Brokers Association
Michigan Business Brokers Association
Midwest Business Brokers Intermediaries
New England Business Brokers Association
New York Association of Business Brokers
Ohio Business Brokers Association
Pennsylvania Business Brokers Association
Texas Association of Business Brokers

Regional (Non US)
 UK: Institute of Transaction Advisers and Business Brokers
 Australia: Australian Institute of Business Brokers 

Chapters
IBBA Canada

References 
CBI Policy

External links
IBBA website

Mergers and acquisitions
Finance industry associations